Mogilyovskoye is a rural locality (a selo) and the administrative centre of Mogilevsky Selsoviet, Khasavyurtovsky District, Republic of Dagestan, Russia. The population was 1,903 as of 2010. There are 33 streets.

Geography 
Mogilyovskoye is located 6 km northeast of Khasavyurt (the district's administrative centre) by road. Petrakovskoye is the nearest rural locality.

References 

Rural localities in Khasavyurtovsky District